Ronnie Corbett's Supper Club is a television pilot that was broadcast on the UKTV channel, Good Food in August 2010. It was hosted by Scottish comedian, Ronnie Corbett, who cooked his guest's chosen meal as if it were to be their last. Ronnie's guest in the Pilot, was Welsh comedian and star of Gavin & Stacey and The Trip, Rob Brydon and Steve Speirs.

External links
 Official Website - UKTV.co.uk

UKTV original programming
Television pilots not picked up as a series
British cooking television shows